Allison Chamberlain is the director of the COVID-19 Response Collaborative (ECRC) and the Emory Center for Public Health Preparedness and Research Acting Director. Her background is in public health preparedness and defense policy.  She is also a Research Associate Professor in the Department of Epidemiology at the Rollins School of Public Health. Her interests include Legionnaires' disease, and vaccine promotion, especially maternal vaccination.,

Biography
Chamberlain earned her BA at the University of Virginia (2004), a MS from Georgetown University in 2007 and a Ph.D. from Emory in 2015.

Select publications
 Adams C, Wortley P, Chamberlain A, Lopman BA. Declining COVID-19 case-fatality in Georgia, USA, March 2020 to March 2021: a sign of real improvement or a broadening epidemic? Ann Epidemiol. 2022 Aug;72:57-64. doi: 10.1016/j.annepidem.2022.05.008. Epub 2022 May 29. PMID 35649472; PMCID: PMC9148435.

References

American women epidemiologists
Emory University alumni
Emory University faculty
Georgetown University alumni
Living people
Public health researchers
University of Virginia alumni
Year of birth missing (living people)
American epidemiologists